Franchy Cordero Vargas (born September 2, 1994) is a Dominican professional baseball outfielder and first baseman in the Baltimore Orioles organization. He made his MLB debut in 2017 with the San Diego Padres and has also played for the Kansas City Royals and Boston Red Sox.

Career

San Diego Padres
Cordero signed with the San Diego Padres as an international free agent in November 2011. He made his professional debut in 2012 with the Dominican Summer League Padres and spent the whole season there, batting .270 with one home run and 38 RBIs in 61 games. In 2013, he played for the Arizona League Padres where he slashed .333/.381/.511 with three home runs and 17 RBIs in 35 games. Cordero started 2014 with the Fort Wayne TinCaps and was demoted to the Eugene Emeralds during the season. In 83 total games between the two teams he batted .255 with nine home runs and 44 RBIs.

He spent 2015 with Fort Wayne where he compiled a .243 batting average with five home runs and 34 RBIs in 126 games. Cordero opened the 2016 season with the Lake Elsinore Storm. During July of the same season, he was promoted to the San Antonio Missions. He also played four games for the El Paso Chihuahuas at the end of the season. In 137 games between the three clubs he batted .290/.344/.450 with 11 home runs and 54 RBIs. The Padres added him to their 40-man roster after the 2016 season.

Cordero began the 2017 season with El Paso. The Padres promoted Cordero to the Major Leagues on May 27, 2017, as regular center fielder Manuel Margot went to the disabled list with a strained calf. He made his major league debut that day, striking out against Stephen Strasburg as a pinch hitter. Cordero started hot, collecting 19 hits in his first 17 games, but then only had one hit in his final 10 games before he was sent back to El Paso on Margot's return. He returned to the Padres for 3 more games in July when Margot was on the paternity list, but finished the season with El Paso.  In 93 games for El Paso he slashed .326/.369/.603 with 17 home runs and 64 RBIs, and in 30 games for the Padres he batted .228/.276/.424 with three home runs and nine RBIs, making 22 starts in center and one in left.

Cordero began 2018 on the disabled list with a groin injury, and reported to the Padres after he was activated in early April. He was the Padres regular starter in left field before he was sent to the disabled list on May 28 with forearm soreness. Cordero began a rehab assignment in El Paso in June, but pain in his right elbow led to the diagnosis of a bone spur after an MRI. Surgery on the elbow ended Cordero's Major League season, but he played in the Dominican Winter League. He finished the regular season hitting .237/.307/.439 with 9 home runs, making 22 starts in left field, 10 in center, and 4 in right.  On April 20, he hit the second-longest home run in MLB for 2018, at 489 feet.

Kansas City Royals
On July 16, 2020, the Padres traded Cordero and Ronald Bolaños to the Kansas City Royals in exchange for Tim Hill. On August 9, 2020, he was placed on the 10-day injured list, but was then transferred to the 45-day injured list on August 10, after suffering a wrist injury. Overall with the 2020 Kansas City Royals, Cordero batted .211 with two home runs and seven RBIs in 16 games.

Boston Red Sox
On February 10, 2021, the Royals traded Cordero to the Boston Red Sox as part of a three-team trade in which the Royals acquired Andrew Benintendi and cash considerations. The Red Sox also acquired Josh Winckowski and three players to be named later, and the New York Mets acquired Khalil Lee. During spring training, Cordero was on the COVID-19 related injured list from February 22 until March 30. After batting .179 in 34 games with Boston, Cordero was optioned to the Triple-A Worcester Red Sox on May 27. After hitting .329 in 44 games in Triple-A, Cordero was recalled to Boston on July 22. He was optioned back to Worcester on August 16, and recalled briefly in early September. Overall during the regular season, Cordero appeared in 48 games for Boston, batting .189, and 78 games for Worcester, where he had a .300 average. On October 21, Cordero was designated for assignment by the Red Sox; he cleared waivers and was assigned outright to Triple-A four days later.

In spring training in 2022, Cordero competed with Travis Shaw, Rob Refsnyder, Christin Stewart, Jonathan Araúz, and Yolmer Sánchez for one of two available spots on Boston's Opening Day roster. He began the season with Worcester, then was added to Boston's active roster on April 29. Cordero was optioned back to Triple-A on August 2, when the team made several trade deadline moves. Cordero was activated for Boston's neutral-site game of August 21, the MLB Little League Classic, then remained with the team, as Eric Hosmer was placed on the injured list prior to Boston's next game. Cordero was placed on the 60-day injured list on September 7, ending his season, due to a right ankle sprain sustained in a game two days prior. For the season, he appeared in 84 games for Boston and batted .219 with eight home runs and 29 RBIs while playing defensively at first base and in all three outfield positions. He was non-tendered and became a free agent on November 18, 2022.

Baltimore Orioles
On December 2, 2022, Cordero signed a minor league contract with the Baltimore Orioles.

Scouting report
Cordero is considered to have elite speed, leading all the minor leagues in triples in 2016 and 2017, and ranking in the top 3% of qualified major league players in sprint speed in 2017. He has also shown elite power, ranking 35th in average batted ball exit velocity in 2017, and 20% of his batted balls exiting at or above .

Personal life
Cordero is a second cousin to Socrates Brito, who has played in MLB and the KBO League.

References

Further reading

External links

1994 births
Living people
People from Azua Province
Major League Baseball outfielders
Major League Baseball players from the Dominican Republic
San Diego Padres players
Kansas City Royals players
Boston Red Sox players
Dominican Republic expatriate baseball players in the United States
Dominican Summer League Padres players
Arizona League Padres players
El Paso Chihuahuas players
Eugene Emeralds players
Fort Wayne TinCaps players
Lake Elsinore Storm players
Leones del Escogido players
Peoria Javelinas players
San Antonio Missions players
Worcester Red Sox players